Gary Vincent Lunn  (born May 8, 1957) is a retired Canadian member of Parliament for the British Columbia riding of Saanich—Gulf Islands. He served in the House of Commons from 1997 to 2011, first as a member of the Reform Party of Canada and subsequently as a member of the Canadian Alliance and the Conservative Party of Canada. He was a Cabinet Minister under Prime Minister Stephen Harper and Official Opposition Critic for Métis and Non-Status Indians, Minister of State for Northern Development, and Critic of the Secretary of State for Human Resources Development. Lunn lost his seat in the 2011 federal election in Canada in an upset to the Leader of the Green Party, Elizabeth May.

Personal life
He is a member of the Conservative Party of Canada as well as the Knights of Columbus. He attended the University of Victoria, where he completed a Bachelor of Law. He practised law in Victoria for two years before seeking the federal nomination for Saanich—Gulf Islands. He and his family reside in Sidney, British Columbia.

Political career
He was first elected to Parliament in the federal election of 1997 as a member of the Reform Party of Canada and was re-elected in 2000 as a member of the Canadian Alliance. In April 2001, Lunn was one of the first Alliance MPs to openly criticize the leadership of Stockwell Day, and was suspended from caucus in May of the same year as a result. He briefly sat with the Democratic Representative Caucus under the leadership of Chuck Strahl, but in November 2001, he left to rejoin the Alliance after Day agreed to hold a leadership race. He was permitted to return to the party in January 2002, during the leadership of John Reynolds, following Day's resignation. In the federal election of 2006, he won re-election against Liberal Candidate Sheila Orr and NDP candidate Jennifer Burgis.

Minister of Natural Resources
Lunn was Minister of Natural Resources in the Cabinet of Prime Minister Stephen Harper from February 6, 2006 to October 30, 2008, when he became Minister of State (Sport) and Minister responsible for the Vancouver 2010 Olympics.

Chalk River reactor shutdown
Lunn fired Linda Keen, the head of the Canadian Nuclear Safety Commission, on January 15, 2008. Keen, who was due to appear before a parliamentary committee the next day, had ordered a shutdown of the NRU reactor at Chalk River, Ontario, which is operated by Atomic Energy of Canada Limited, in November 2007 over the AECL's failure to perform safety upgrades. 

Appearing before a parliamentary committee January 16, 2008 Lunn refused to cite one example of what Linda Keen had done wrong in her job, only that she had lost the confidence of the government. "These are the kinds of Republican tactics this town has never seen before," Liberal MP David McGuinty (Ottawa South) told the natural resources committee. "The Prime Minister and the people around the Prime Minister will stop at nothing. ... They will fabricate, in my mind, a case to dismiss a senior official, an independent regulator," McGuinty told reporters later. Lunn told the committee: "We do not believe she fulfilled her duties. There was an urgency to this situation, make no mistake ... it would have meant life and death for some patients."

AECL falls under Lunn's management as Minister of Energy and Natural Resources. The reactor shutdown caused problems with supply shortage of medical radioisotopes, which are used for testing to determine whether a patient has a disease. Canada produces more than half the world's supply. The House of Commons of Canada passed emergency legislation in mid-December 2007, with unanimous support, to get NRU restarted quickly. There has been no backup reactor for NRU since NRX was decommissioned in 1992, making it very difficult for upgrades and maintenance to be performed on NRU.

Electoral record

References

External links
Gary Lunn's Official Website

1957 births
Members of the House of Commons of Canada from British Columbia
Reform Party of Canada MPs
Canadian Alliance MPs
Conservative Party of Canada MPs
Members of the King's Privy Council for Canada
Living people
People from the Capital Regional District
People from Trail, British Columbia
University of Victoria alumni
Lawyers in British Columbia
Canadian lawyers
Members of the 28th Canadian Ministry
University of Victoria Faculty of Law alumni
Politicians affected by a party expulsion process